Nordstormarn is an Amt ("collective municipality") in the district of Stormarn, in Schleswig-Holstein, Germany. It is situated around Reinfeld, which is the seat of the Amt, but not part of it.

The Amt Nordstormarn consists of the following municipalities:

Badendorf 
Barnitz 
Feldhorst 
Hamberge 
Heidekamp 
Heilshoop 
Klein Wesenberg 
Mönkhagen 
Rehhorst 
Wesenberg 
Westerau 
Zarpen

Ämter in Schleswig-Holstein